Greater Kankakee Airport  is a public use airport located three nautical miles (6 km) south of the central business district of Kankakee, a city in Kankakee County, Illinois, United States. It is included in the National Plan of Integrated Airport Systems for 2011–2015, which categorized it as a general aviation facility.

The airport was opened in 1962 and continues to operate as a general aviation facility serving the Kankakee area and South Chicago. It is the largest airport between the Chicago Midway Airport and the Champaign Airport. Greater Kankakee is a general aviation airport, consisting of mostly private aircraft with a mix of corporate and business aircraft usage.

The airport is owned and operated by the Kankakee Valley Airport Authority.  The authority has an appointed board of directors totaling six members: three members from the Kankakee County Board and one each from the communities of Kankakee, Bradley, and Bourbonnais.

The airport received $1.6 million from the State of Illinois as part of the Rebuild Illinois program during the covid-19 pandemic. The airport planned to upgrade the airport's north/south runway and relocate one of the main taxiway ramps. Talks to upgrade these facilities had already been in the works for years as the airport aims to be able to accept larger aircraft on a more frequent basis by adding width and runway strength. Upgrades are expected to be completed in 2023.

Facilities and aircraft 
Greater Kankakee Airport covers an area of 950 acres (384 ha) at an elevation of 629 feet (192 m) above mean sea level. It has two runways with asphalt surfaces: 4/22 is 5,981 by 100 feet (1,823 x 30 m) and 16/34 is 4,398 by 75 feet (1,341 x 23 m).

For the 12-month period ending May 31, 2011, the airport had 50,000 aircraft operations, an average of 136 per day: 92% general aviation, 6% military, and 2% air taxi. At that time there were 119 aircraft based at this airport: 74% single-engine, 13% ultralight, 9% multi-engine, 3% jet, and 2% helicopter.

See also 
 Kankakee Airport (FAA: 3KK), located at

References

External links 

 Kankakee Valley Airport Authority, official site
 Aerial image as of March 1999 from USGS The National Map
 

Kankakee
Buildings and structures in Kankakee County, Illinois